The Emilio Aguinaldo Highway, (often shortened as Aguinaldo Highway), alternatively known as Cavite–Batangas Road and Cavite-Manila South Road, is a four-to-six lane, network of primary and secondary  highways passing through the busiest towns and cities of Cavite, Philippines. It is the busiest and most congested of the three major highways located in the province, the others are Governor's Drive and Antero Soriano Highway.

The highway is named in the honor of General Emilio Aguinaldo, the country's first president and a native of Cavite.

The northern terminus of the highway is located at the Zapote Bridge at the province's boundary with Las Piñas in Metro Manila. It then traverses Bacoor, Imus, Dasmariñas, Silang, and ends at Tagaytay in Cavite. The highway forms part of National Routes 62, 419, and 410 of the Philippine highway network. The highway has several official names, like Manila–Cavite South Road, Cavite–Batangas Road, and Tagaytay-Manila via Silang Road. The west alignment of the poblacion area of Silang, is unnumbered as a newer bypass named Silang Bypass Road (or Silang Diversion Road) and is designated as a tertiary road. The section that connects with Manila–Cavite Expressway (then Coastal Road), called the Aguinaldo Boulevard, is also designated as National Route 62 (N62) of the Philippine highway network.

Route description 

Aguinaldo Highway passes through many establishments such as malls, shops, and government offices. Various high voltage power lines, most notably the Dasmariñas-Las Piñas transmission line of National Grid Corporation of the Philippines (NGCP), utilize the highway right of way from its intersection with Aguinaldo Boulevard and Bacoor Boulevard to Barangay San Agustin II, Dasmariñas for accessibility to work vehicles and also due to scarcity of land for dedicated right of way.

Originally with four lanes, it starts as a continuation of Diego Cera Avenue at Zapote Bridge. It crosses and becomes a six-lane road past Bacoor Boulevard which leads to Molino, Bacoor, and Aguinaldo Boulevard, which connects with Manila–Cavite Expressway. It then intersects with Tirona Highway that leads to Kawit and Cavite City. It then passes Imus and enters Dasmariñas, where it reduces to a four-lane road and becoming a divided highway in most portions. Afterwards, it then intersects with Governor's Drive and Pala-Pala Road in Dasmariñas.

Past Pala-Pala Road, it begins its climb to Tagaytay, passing Silang and ends at Tagaytay Rotonda. The highway continues as Tagaytay–Nasugbu Highway as it passes the rest of Tagaytay and Alfonso in Cavite before entering the province of Batangas.

History
The present road originated from an old road that enters Cavite from Las Piñas. The old roads that predated the Aguinaldo Highway used a different alignment on Bacoor and Imus, that exist until today as a mixture of city-maintained roads and national roads. Portions of the road have been sites of battles of the Philippine Revolution.

During the American colonial era, the road reached as far as Silang. From 1933 to 1935, the section of the highway from Silang to Tagaytay was constructed using prisoners as construction workers. In 1938, the highway was made into concrete by President Manuel L. Quezon. The old roads that passed on the western barangays of Bacoor and Imus are bypassed by a new alignment that existed until today. The road formed part of Highway 17 that linked Imus with Batangas. It was also part of the Cavite-Manila South Road, which was renamed to Mexico Road in 1964, the year designated as "The Year of Philippine-Mexican Friendship."

Intersections

References

External links 

Roads in Cavite

de:Pan-Philippinische Straße
nl:Pan-Filipijnse snelweg